Graham bread is a name for whole wheat bread that was inspired by the teachings of famous health reformer Sylvester Graham.

History 
Sylvester Graham was a 19th-century health reformer who argued that a vegetarian diet, anchored by bread that was baked at home from flour that was made from whole wheat flour, was part of a healthful lifestyle that could prevent disease.

In 1837, Graham published the popular book Treatise on Bread and Bread-Making, which included a history of bread and described how to make Graham bread, though the passage is absent of any exact measurements and instead calls upon the baker's "good judgment." It was reprinted in 2012 by Andrews McMeel Publishing, as a selection of its American Antiquarian Cookbook Collection. 

Like Graham crackers, Graham bread was high in fiber and made from graham flour free from the chemical additives that were common in white bread at that time such as alum and chlorine. He argued that these chemical additives were unwholesome.

See also
Graham crackers, also inspired by Graham
Graham flour
Brown bread, a bread that was considered undesirable in early 19th century Europe
Whole wheat flour
Flour bleaching agent
Health food
Horsebread, a medieval European coarse bread that may have additionally contained the husks or chaff of the grains as well as legumes
Maida flour, example of a bleached flour used in India

References

American breads
Whole wheat breads